Eugenio Suárez Santos (born 4 February 1980), known as Geni, is a Spanish professional footballer who plays as a forward.

Club career
Born in Gijón, Asturias, Geni emerged through neighbours Real Oviedo's youth system, making his first-team debut not yet aged 19 as the club was then in La Liga. Definitely promoted to the main squad in 2000, he would see them drop two tiers in only two years.

Geni then moved to Rayo Vallecano in the second division, playing almost 30 games without scoring in his first season, which ended in another relegation, and leaving in 2006 to another side in the third level, Real Jaén, where he appeared and scored regularly.

In 2009, Geni signed with Deportivo Alavés, with the Basques in division three. He continued competing there until the end of the 2014–15 campaign, also representing Real Avilés.

Personal life
Geni's younger brother, Alberto, was also a professional footballer. He spent the vast majority of his career in the third tier.

References

External links

1980 births
Living people
Footballers from Gijón
Spanish footballers
Association football forwards
La Liga players
Segunda División players
Segunda División B players
Tercera División players
Real Oviedo Vetusta players
Real Oviedo players
Rayo Vallecano players
Real Jaén footballers
Deportivo Alavés players
Real Avilés CF footballers
Marino de Luanco footballers